The Family is an outdoor 1985 sculpture by Peter Teneau, installed on the Oregon State University campus in Corvallis, Oregon, United States. The painted aluminum and granite sculpture measures approximately  x  x , . The Smithsonian Institution, which surveyed the work as part of its "Save Outdoor Sculpture!" program in 1993, categorizes The Family as allegorical (representing life and family) and geometric.

References

1985 establishments in Oregon
1985 sculptures
Abstract sculptures in Oregon
Allegorical sculptures in Oregon
Aluminum sculptures in Oregon
Granite sculptures in Oregon
Oregon State University campus
Outdoor sculptures in Corvallis, Oregon